Flopropione (Compacsul, Cospanon, Ecapron, Pellegal, Argobyl, Floveton, Saritron, Spamorin, Labrodax, Tryalon, Mirulevatin, Padeskin, Profenon) is a spasmolytic or antispasmodic agent. It acts as a COMT inhibitor.

It is synthesized from phloroglucinol in a Hoesch reaction.

See also
2,4,6-Trihydroxyacetophenone (THAP)

References 

Phloroglucinols
Aromatic ketones
Serotonin receptor antagonists
3-Hydroxypropenals